The Indian Federation of App-based Transport Workers (IFAT) is a trade union federation of ride-sharing and other gig transport workers. In India, this includes the workers on platforms such as Ola, Uber, Swiggy, Zomato, Rapido and Dunzo. The federation is affiliated with the International Transport Workers Federation.

Organisation and affiliates

 Maharashtra App-based Transport Workers Union (MATWU)                
 Shivsangram Taxi & Rickshaw Union (STRU)
 Telangana Four Wheeler Driver's Association (TFWDA)
 Namma Chalakara Trade Union (NCTU) 
 Sarvodya Driver Association of Delhi (SDAOD)
 Online Cab Operators Guild (OCOG)
 Independent App-Based Cab and Drivers Association (Lukhnow)

History
IFAT was founded on September 22, 2019 at a conference in Mumbai. Demands at its founding conference included a minimum price per kilometre, a welfare board for drivers and government insurance.

During the COVID-19 pandemic, IFAT demanded that companies should provide their workers with personal protective equipment and called on the government to provide insurance to gig transport workers. According to the union, over 38,000 workers took part in nationwide protests for these demands in June 2020. The union also criticised the decision by companies to make downloading the Aarogya Setu contact tracing app mandatory for drivers, saying that it would allow the companies to track their workers. In September of that year, IFAT workers with Swiggy went on strike to demand the restoration of an old payment structure in which they received more money for deliveries between three and six kilometres.

In February 2021, IFAT workers went on strike in Hyderabad, demanding an increase in fares to compensate for rising fuel prices. 

In September 2021, IFAT filed a public interest litigation in the Supreme Court, with regards to the employee classification, specifically inclusion in the Unorganised Workers' Social Security Act 2008.

See also 

 New York Taxi Workers' Alliance

References

National federations of trade unions
2019 establishments in India
Trade unions established in 2019
Transport trade unions in India
Tech sector trade unions